Yumbe is a town in the Northern Region of Uganda. It is the district headquarters of Yumbe District.

Location

Population
The national census conducted in 2002, enumerated the population of Yumbe Town Council at 15,401. The 2014 national census and household survey, put the population of the town at 34,806 inhabitants. In 2020, the Uganda Bureau of Statistics (UBOS) estimated the mid-year population of Yumbe Town at 47,400. UBOS calculated that the population of Yumbe Town Council increased at an average annual rate of 5.5 percent, between 2014 and 2020.

Points of interest
The following points of interest lie within the town or near the town limits: (a) the offices of Yumbe Town Council (b) the headquarters of Yumbe District Administration and (c) Yumbe Central Market, the source of daily fresh produce.

Yumbe General Hospital, a 100-bed public hospital administered by the Uganda Ministry of Health, was upgraded to a referral hospital in January 2021, following renovations.

The Koboko–Yumbe–Moyo Road passes through Yumbe Town, in a general southwest to northeast direction. In 2020, the International Development Association (IDA), a member of the World Bank Group provided a grant of US$130.8 million to upgrade this road to class II bitumen surface, with shoulders, culverts and drainage channels.

See also
 West Nile sub-region
 List of cities and towns in Uganda

References

External links
 Yumbe District Information Portal

Populated places in Northern Region, Uganda
West Nile sub-region
Yumbe District